Naiqama is a name of Fijian origin. Notable people with the name include:

Kevin Naiqama (born 1989), Australian-Fijian Rugby League player
Wes Naiqama (born 1982), Australian-Fijian Rugby League player
Naiqama Lalabalavu (born 1953), Fijian Chief

Fijian-language surnames